Craig Moss is an American film director, writer and actor known for making parody, action and horror films. His films include The 41-Year-Old Virgin Who Knocked Up Sarah Marshall and Felt Superbad About It, Bad Ass, and its sequels, Bad Ass 2: Bad Asses and ''Bad Asses on the Bayou.

Moss graduated from University of California (Los Angeles), and he is an owner of a film production company Spotfellas.

Filmography

References

External links 

American male screenwriters
American film directors
American parodists
Living people
Place of birth missing (living people)
Year of birth missing (living people)
University of California, Los Angeles alumni
Action film directors
Comedy film directors
Parody film directors
Horror film directors